Iracema is an oil field located in the Santos Basin,  off the coast of Rio de Janeiro, Brazil,  northwest of the giant Tupi oil field. Iracema is the third well drilled in the BM-S-11 block and could be an extension of ultra deep Tupi oil field. The field was previously called Cernambi.

Etymology 
The field was named in honor of the Guarani Iracema figure from Brazilian mythology.

History 
The oil produced at Iracema is 32° API.

Ownership 
BM-S-11 block which contains Iracema oil field is operated by Petrobras with controlling 65% of the stake while BG Group holds a 25% and Galp Energia holds 10% of the share.

Reservoir 
The depth, thickness of the salt and drastic changes in temperatures make the process of oil extraction particularly difficult which make the project financially challenging. Petrobras announced it would invite international oil companies to bid for concessions in the region.

See also 

 Campos Basin
 Pre-salt layer
 Tupi oil field
 Iara oil field

References 

Oil fields of Brazil
Santos Basin
Petrobras oil and gas fields
Tupi–Guarani languages
2009 establishments in Brazil
Galp Energia